U218 Videos is a music video compilation DVD by U2 from 2006, released the same day as its compilation album, U218 Singles.  The compilation features their most popular videos from "New Year's Day" in 1983 to "The Saints Are Coming" in 2006.  The DVD features videos from the band's two previous music video compilations, The Best of 1980–1990 and The Best of 1990–2000, as well as several videos that have never been previously released.  The main section of the DVD contains 19 videos, including two videos for both "Stuck in a Moment You Can't Get Out Of" and "Walk On."  The DVD also contains bonus material with two documentaries, The Making of "Vertigo" and A Story of One, as well as seven additional music videos.

Track listing
"Beautiful Day" (All That You Can't Leave Behind, September 2000)
 Directed by Jonas Åkerlund
"I Still Haven't Found What I'm Looking For" (The Joshua Tree, May 1987)
 Directed by Barry Devlin
"Pride (In the Name of Love)" (The Unforgettable Fire, November 1984)
 Directed by Donald Cammell
"With or Without You" (The Joshua Tree, March 1987)
 Directed by Meiert Avis
"Vertigo" (How to Dismantle an Atomic Bomb, November 2004)
 Directed by Alex and Martin
"New Year's Day" (War, January 1983)
 Directed by Meiert Avis
"Mysterious Ways" (Achtung Baby, November 1991)
 Directed by Stéphane Sednaoui
"Stuck in a Moment You Can't Get Out Of" (U.S. version) (All That You Can't Leave Behind, January 2001)
 Directed by Joseph Kahn
"Stuck in a Moment You Can't Get Out Of" (International version)
 Directed by Kevin Godley
"Where the Streets Have No Name" (The Joshua Tree, August 1987)
 Directed by Meiert Avis
"Sweetest Thing" (The Best of 1980–1990, November 1998)
 Directed by Kevin Godley
"Sunday Bloody Sunday" (War, March 1983)
 Directed by Gavin Taylor (U2 Live at Red Rocks: Under a Blood Red Sky)
"One" (Achtung Baby, March 1992)
 Directed by Anton Corbijn
"Desire" (Rattle and Hum, September 1988)
 Directed by Richard Lowenstein
"Walk On" (International version) (All That You Can't Leave Behind, November 2001)
 Directed by Jonas Åkerlund
"Walk On" (U.S. version)
 Directed by Liz Friedlander
"Elevation" (All That You Can't Leave Behind, July 2001)
 Directed by Joseph Kahn
"Sometimes You Can't Make It on Your Own" (How to Dismantle an Atomic Bomb, February 2005)
 Directed by Phil Joanou
"The Saints Are Coming" (U218 Singles, October 2006) (Live version) 
 Directed by Chris Milk

Extras
The Making of "Vertigo" (Documentary)
A Story of One (Documentary)
"Beautiful Day" (Èze version)
"Pride (In the Name of Love)" (Slane Castle version)
"Vertigo" (Lisbon version)
"Vertigo" (HQ version)
"One" (Buffalo version)
"One" (Restaurant version)
"Sometimes You Can't Make It on Your Own" (Single take version)

Charts and certifications

References 

U2 video albums
2006 video albums
Music video compilation albums
2006 compilation albums
U2 compilation albums
Interscope Records compilation albums
Interscope Records video albums
Mercury Records compilation albums
Mercury Records video albums